The National Weather Service Fort Worth, Texas (NWS Fort Worth) is a local weather forecast office of the National Weather Service responsible for monitoring weather conditions for 46 counties in north central Texas, including the Dallas-Fort Worth Metro Area (the Metroplex) and Waco, Texas.

History

Present day
The current National Weather Service Fort Worth is located at 3401 Northern Cross Blvd, Fort Worth, TX in the northeastern part of Fort Worth, near Meacham International Airport, and is in charge of issuing local forecasts and weather warnings for north central Texas. It is one of 13 National Weather Service offices located in Texas.

The building that the Fort Worth office is located in also houses the West Gulf River Forecast Center, one of 13 in the United States. This office is responsible for the entire river basin between the Sabine River along the Texas-Louisiana border in the east to the Rio Grande River in southern Colorado, New Mexico, and south Texas. Other rivers in the responsibility area of the WGRFC include the Pecos, Nueces, San Antonio River, Guadalupe, Colorado, Brazos, Trinity, and Neches rivers.

NOAA Weather Radio

The Fort Worth Weather Forecast Office maintains thirteen NOAA Weather Radio transmitters across north Texas and far south Oklahoma to transmit routine extended and specialized short-term forecasts, current weather observations, hazardous weather outlooks and historical weather information. Each of the transmitters, through the Emergency Alert System, also disseminate watches, warnings and advisories issued by the NWS office, severe thunderstorm and tornado watches issued by the Storm Prediction Center and other emergency information to the public.

The office schedules a required weekly test of the Specific Area Message Encoding system for public alert dissemination on all thirteen NOAA Weather Radio transmitters in the region each Wednesday between 10:00 a.m. and 12:00 p.m. and between 6:00 p.m. and 8:00 p.m. (all times Central); exceptions exist if there is a threat of severe weather that day within the listening area of any or all of the stations, in which case the test will be postponed until the following Wednesday, barring that severe weather is not forecast to occur then.

The Lightning Bolt
Since early 2009, all NOAA Weather Radio Stations within the North Texas region began airing a monthly 15 minute talk show titled "The Lightning Bolt" where two to five listener-submitted questions related to weather are answered by meteorologists, who also would provide weather-related safety tips and trivia.

Stations

References

External links
 Official NWS Fort Worth Website
 NWS Fort Worth's official Twitter page

Fort Worth, Texas